The 1952–53 Georgetown Hoyas men's basketball team represented Georgetown University during the 1952–53 NCAA college basketball season. Harry "Buddy" Jeannette – who had played professional basketball from 1938 to 1950 and had coached the original Baltimore Bullets from 1947 to 1951 – coached the 1952–53 Hoyas in his first season as head coach. The team was an independent and played its home games at McDonough Gymnasium on the Georgetown campus in Washington, D.C. It finished with a record of 13-7 – the most successful team of Jeannette's four-year tenure as head coach – and became the first Georgetown men's basketball team ever to be invited to the National Invitation Tournament (NIT), losing to Louisville in the first round of the 1953 NIT.

Season recap
Junior guard Lou Gigante became the team's starting point guard this season. He scored in all 20 of the team's games and in double figures in 11 of the last 15 during the Hoyas' drive for a post-season tournament berth; his 17 points against Navy was particularly notable, and his play at point guard brought the Hoyas close to an upset of a 4th-ranked La Salle team led by Tom Gola.

Although one of the previous season's top scorers, Barry Sullivan, left school for military service and did not return for this season, the other half of that year's scoring tandem, now-senior center and team captain Bill Bolger, did return. He played in all 20 games and led the team in scoring in 11 of them. He had double-figure scoring performances in 18 games, including 29 against Seattle and 26 against Rhode Island back-to-back in the two games of the Boston Arena Tournament in late December 1952 and 17 points against St. Joseph's and 23 against Fordham in big wins later in the year as Georgetown made its push for a postseason tournament bid.

Also starring during the year was senior center Hugh Beins. Beins played in all 20 games and scored in double figures 13 times, with particularly impressive performances against Temple, Virginia, and Fordham and a career-high 23 points against Canisius. He also turned in one of his finest defensive performances against George Washington, holding George Washington star Joe Holup – a 2,000-point, 2,000-rebound player during his collegiate career – to nine points as the Hoyas beat the Colonials in the regular-season finale, Georgetown's only defeat of George Washington during Holup's college years.

The win over Fordham was crucial in convincing the National Invitation Tournament (NIT) selection committee to invite Georgetown to the 1953 NIT, the school's first-ever NIT appearance. It was only the second post-season tournament appearance in Georgetown men's basketball history and the first since the 1942–43 team advanced to the final game of the 1943 NCAA Tournament. In the first round of the NIT, the Hoyas met Louisville at Madison Square Garden. Gigante scored 13 points and Bolger had a team-high 20-point performance. But fouls plagued Georgetown during the game; five Hoyas fouled out, and Louisville made 36 of its 52 free throws and won the game 92–79 to knock Georgetown out of the postseason.

Bolger graduated as the leading scorer in Georgetown history at the time, and the second to score 1,000 points – doing it in three seasons when the only other 1,000-point scorer in school history, Tommy O'Keefe, had taken four seasons to hit that mark. Although rebounds were not tracked in college basketball until the 1953–54 season, it was estimated in 1978 that Bolger may have averaged 17 rebounds per game during his collegiate career.

Georgetown would not appear in a post-season tournament again until the 1969-70 team played in the 1970 NIT.

Roster
Sources

Rankings

Source

The 1952–53 squad was ranked 20th in the Associated Press Poll on January 13, 1953. Although only ranked for a week, it was the first team in Georgetown men's basketball history to be ranked in the poll. No Georgetown men's team would be ranked in the AP Poll again until the 1977-78 season.

The 1952–53 team was not ranked in the Coaches' Poll at any time.

1952–53 schedule and results

Sources

|-
!colspan=9 style="background:#002147; color:#8D817B;"| Regular Season

|-
!colspan=9 style="background:#002147; color:#8D817B;"| National Invitation Tournament

References

Georgetown Hoyas men's basketball seasons
Georgetown
Georgetown
Georgetown Hoyas men's basketball team
Georgetown Hoyas men's basketball team